Dante Scott Leon (born May 6, 1995) is a Canadian grappler and Brazilian jiu-jitsu (BJJ) black belt competitor. 

A multiple-time World and Pan No-Gi champion in the lower belts divisions, Leon is a two-time black belt IBJJF No-Gi World champion, two-time No-Gi Pan champion, American Nationals champion as well as an ADCC Submission Fighting World Championship bronze medallist.

Early life 
Leon was born on May 6, 1995 in Harrow, Essex County, Ontario, Canada. He grew up playing Ice hockey then was introduced to martial arts and boxing by his father when he was 6. Leon started Brazilian jiu-jitsu (BJJ) in Detroit, Michigan, from the age of 12. His first instructor was the late Dean Hersche. As a blue belt Leon won the IBJJF World Juvenile Championship twice (2012, 2013) the IBJJF Pans Championship and the IBJJF Pans Juvenile Championship. 

After being promoted to purple belt Leon won the 2015 IBJJF Pans No-Gi Championship under the Gracie Humaitá/Ribeiro Jiu-Jitsu team. Leon then joined GF Team under Abraham Marte and Vitor Oliveira. After getting his brown belt, he moved to Toledo, Ohio to train full time. As a brown belt Leon won the World No-Gi Championship as well as Pan No-Gi. In 2017 he won silver at the IBJJF World Championship.

Black belt career 
In June 2017, Leon was promoted to black belt by Júlio César Pereira and  Oliveira, that same year Leon won the American No-Gi Nationals and the IBJJF Pans No-Gi. At the 2018 World No-Gi Championship, Leon won bronze after reaching the semifinals before losing to Hugo Marques. In 2019, he became black belt No-Gi World champion for the first time, after defeating Jaime Canuto 4x2 in the finals.

Competing in the KASAI Elite Grappling Championships, Leon defeated Edwin Najmi via rear naked choke on April 6, 2019, during Kasai Pro 5. On February 1, 2020 at Kasai Pro 7, Leon defeated Renato Canuto via points.

In 2021, Leon finished second of No-Gi World after losing to Marques by referee decision in the final. In October 2021, Leon announced he would be officially joining Pedigo Submission Fighting to compete under their banner. 

At the 2022 ADCC World Championship, Leon defeated Magid Hage and Mateusz Szczecinski before losing to Micael Galvão in the semi-finals. He won the bronze medal match by defeating PJ Barch. In 2022 Leon became No-Gi World champion for the second time after defeating Carlos Henrique 2 points 0 in the final.

On February 26, 2023, Leon won the middleweight division and the absolute division at the IBJJF Tampa International Open.

Leon has been noted for his significant strength as given by his weightlifting figures.

Grappling competitive summary 
Main Achievements as black belt:

 IBJJF World No-Gi Champion (2019/2022)
 IBJJF Pans No-Gi Champion (2019/2022)
 Kasai 170 lbs Champion (2020)
 IBJJF American Nationals No-Gi Champion (2017)
 2nd place IBJJF World No-Gi Championship (2021)
 3rd place IBJJF World No-Gi Championship (2018)
 3rd place IBJJF American Nationals No-Gi (2017)

Main Achievements as coloured belt:

 IBJJF World No-Gi Champion (2016 brown)
 IBJJF Pans Champion (2013 blue, 2016 brown)
 IBJJF Pans No-Gi Champion (2015 purple, 2016 brown)
 UAEJJF USA National Pro (2016 brown)
 2nd place IBJJF World Championship (2017 brown)
 2nd place IBJJF Pans Championship (2013 blue)
 2nd place UAEJJF Abu Dhabi Pro (2016 brown)
 3rd place IBJJF Pans No-Gi Championship (2015 purple)

Main Achievements (juvenile divisions):
 IBJJF World Juvenile Champion (2012 blue)
 IBJJF Pans Juvenile Champion (2012 blue)
 2nd place IBJJF World Juvenile Championship (2012 blue)

Instructor lineage 
Lineage 1: Kanō Jigorō → Mitsuyo Maeda → Luis França > Oswaldo Fadda→ Monir Salomão → Júlio César Pereira → Dante Leon

Lineage 2: Kanō Jigorō → Mitsuyo Maeda → Carlos Gracie Sr. → Helio Gracie → Carlos Gracie Jr. → Adilson Lima → Vitor Oliveira → Dante Leon

Notes

References 

1995 births
Living people
Canadian practitioners of Brazilian jiu-jitsu
Canadian submission wrestlers
People awarded a black belt in Brazilian jiu-jitsu
Submission grapplers
World Brazilian Jiu-Jitsu Championship medalists
World No-Gi Brazilian Jiu-Jitsu Championship medalists